The women's 400 metres hurdles competition at the 2018 Asian Games took place on 26 and 27 August 2018 at the Gelora Bung Karno Stadium.

Schedule
All times are Western Indonesia Time (UTC+07:00)

Records

Results

Round 1
 Qualification: First 3 in each heat (Q) and the next 2 fastest (q) advance to the final.

Heat 1

Heat 2

Final 

 Kemi Adekoya originally won the gold medal, but she was disqualified after she tested positive for stanozolol. The Athletics Integrity Unit also ordered that her results from 24 August 2018 be deleted from the records.

References

Women's 400 metres hurdles
2018 women